The following is a list of published (and some unpublished) works by or about the American film director Woody Allen.

Books
Getting Even (1971), 
Without Feathers (1975), 
Side Effects (1980), 
 The Insanity Defense: The Complete Prose. New York: Random House Trade Paperbacks, 2007, .
Mere Anarchy (2007), 
 Apropos of Nothing (2020), New York: Arcade Publishing
 Zero Gravity (2022), New York: Arcade Publishing

Compilation
The Complete Prose of Woody Allen: Without feathers, Getting even and Side effects (1991) 

Interviews
 Woody Allen on Woody Allen: In Conversation with Stig Björkman (2005)
Woody Allen: Interviews (2006) 

Chapbook
Lunatic's Tale (1986),  (Short story previously included in Side Effects.)

The New Yorker pieces
Since 1966, Allen has written more than 38 humorous pieces for The New Yorker.

Plays

Biography

Critical studies

Woody Allen: Conversations with Filmmakers Series, ed. R. E. Kapsis and K. Coblentz, (2006) 
 Ava Cahen, Woody Allen : Profession : cynique, L'Archipel, 2015
 Brook, Vincent and Grinberg, Marat (Eds.): Woody on Rye. Jewishness in the films and plays of Woody Allen, Brandeis University Press, 2014
Essay by Victoria Loy on Woody Allen's career, Senseofcinema.com

References

Allen, Woody
Bibliography